Pelagodes maipoensis is a moth of the family Geometridae. It is known only from the Mai Po Nature Reserve and the Hong Kong Wetland Park.

External links
World Wide Fund For Nature Hong Kong - Priority Research Areas and Suggested Topics for Deep Bay 2009
Hongxiang Han & Dayong Xue, 2011.Thalassodes and related taxa of emerald moths in China (Geometridae, Geometrinae). Zootaxa 3019:26-50

Hemitheini
Moths described in 1997